Simon Marsh (fl. 1399), of Totnes, Devon, was an English politician.

He was a Member (MP) of the Parliament of England for Totnes in 1399.

References

Year of birth missing
Year of death missing
English MPs 1399
Members of the Parliament of England (pre-1707) for Totnes